Level Up is a 2019 South Korean television series starring Sung Hoon, Han Bo-reum, Baro, Kang Byul and Danny Ahn. Produced by iHQ and ANEW Productions, it aired from July 10 to August 15, 2019 on Wednesdays and Thursdays at 23:00 (KST) time slot of MBN and Dramax.

Synopsis
An Dan-Te is a director at Yoosung CRC, which specializes in restructuring companies. He does not express his feelings and he is a perfectionist at work. He seems cold-blooded. To save the game company Joybuster from bankruptcy, An Dan-Te is sent there and begins to work as their new CEO.

Meanwhile, Shin Yeon-Hwa is head of game development at Joybuster. She works on a new game, which can satisfy CEO An Dan-Te, but they come into conflict on pretty much everything.

Cast

Main
 Sung Hoon as Ahn Dan Te
Head of headquarters for Yuseong CRC.
The ace of Yuseong CRC, a company that specializes in structural reorganization. Any floundering company will be transformed into a thriving business under his magic hands. His impeccable manner of handling work comes with a hot personality and cold-hearted ruthlessness. Although he tried not to work with game companies due to bad childhood memories involving games, he starts to break the rules he imposed on himself one by one while working with Yeon Hwa.
 
 Han Bo-reum as Shin Yeon Hwa
Leader of Joybuster Development.
After working at Joybuster for 3 years, she suddenly became the head of the design division after a series of voluntary resignations. She mistook Dan Te as one of the company shareholders and was shocked to discover that he would be Joybuster's new CEO. She's passionate and good at designing games, but she was unable to let her ideas come to fruition because of her lack of experience.
 Baro as Kwak Han Cheol
New employee at Yuseong CRC.
A nice guy who pursues happiness over success. He gave up on going to college due to a family situation. After helping his father for a few years, he jumped into the job market later than his peers. By a strike of fate in his mundane life, he met Dan Te & Yeon Hwa. He considered Dan Te as a life coach, and Yeon Hwa as his soul mate.
 Kang Byul as Bae Ya Che
CEO of Arena Entertainment
She's the CEO of one of the companies Dan Te saved and has an unrequited love for him, and insists on having some kind of relationship, even though Dante makes it clear he has no interest. She becomes jealous of Yeon Hwa as she thinks they are competing for Dan Te's affections.
 Danny Ahn as Park Gi Woo
General Manager of Yuseong CRC.
Dan Te's right-hand man. He is the only son of Yuseong's CEO. Gil Woo is aware that he's nowhere near as skilled as Dan Te. He trusts and follows Dan Te and is satisfied as the General Manager. He's a simple guy who prefers happiness over success with YOLO as his life motto.

Supporting
 Shin Jung-yoon as Song Joo-im
 Ryu Seung-soo as Jo Tae-goo
 Lee Byung-joon as Shin Yeon-hwa
 Jung Soo-kyo as Kang Seong-goo
 Son Sang-yeon as Kang Hoon
 Lee Ga-won as Oh Mi-ja
 Son Jin-hwan as Dan-te's father
 Kim Ji-in as Sang-mi

Original soundtrack

Ratings 
In this table,  represent the lowest ratings and  represent the highest ratings.

References

External links
  (Dramax) 
 Official website (MBN) 
 

Maeil Broadcasting Network television dramas
Dramax television dramas
Korean-language television shows
2019 South Korean television series debuts
2019 South Korean television series endings
South Korean romantic comedy television series